Robert Pollock (1 June 1880–unknown) was a Scottish footballer who played in the Football League for Leicester Fosse.

References

1880 births
Scottish footballers
Association football forwards
English Football League players
Wishaw Thistle F.C. players
Third Lanark A.C. players
Bristol City F.C. players
Kettering Town F.C. players
Notts County F.C. players
Leicester City F.C. players
Leyton F.C. players
Year of death missing